This is a list of songs written by the English singer-songwriter Roy Wood.

Released songs 

Wood, Roy